Taenaris urania is a butterfly in the family Nymphalidae. It is found in Asia.

Subspecies
Taenaris urania urania (Ambon, Saparua)
Taenaris urania pandemos Fruhstorfer, 1911 (Serang, Gisser Islands)
Taenaris urania hollandi Fruhstorfer, 1904 (Buru)

References

External links

Butterflies described in 1758
Taxa named by Carl Linnaeus
Taenaris